Ugo Camozzo (28 November 1892 – 7 July 1977) was an Italian prelate.

He was ordained in 1914 and worked for the Patriarchate of Venice until 1938, year in which he was consecrated Archbishop of Fiume (modern Rijeka) at that time part of Italy.

After World War II when Yugoslavia gained control over the city of Rijeka, and like all the Italians living there, Archbishop Camozzo was forced into exile in 1947. The following year Pope Pius XII named him Archbishop of Pisa.

He resigned on 22 September 1970 and died, aged 84, on 7 July 1977. He was the last Italian Archbishop of Fiume.

1892 births
1977 deaths
Roman Catholic archbishops of Pisa
Participants in the Second Vatican Council
20th-century Italian Roman Catholic archbishops